is a professional Japanese baseball player. He plays pitcher for the Orix Buffaloes.

References 

1994 births
Living people
Baseball people from Shizuoka Prefecture
Japanese baseball players
Nippon Professional Baseball pitchers
Hanshin Tigers players
Orix Buffaloes players